Iván Martos Campillo (born 15 May 1997) is a Spanish professional footballer who plays for FC Cartagena, on loan from UD Almería. Mainly a left back, he can also play as a central defender.

Club career
Born in Manresa, Barcelona, Catalonia, Martos joined UD Almería's youth setup on 31 July 2013, after previous stints at Club Gimnàstic Manresa, CF Damm and FC Barcelona. He made his senior debut with the reserves on 8 November 2015, starting in a 1–1 Segunda División B home draw against UD Melilla.

Martos scored his first senior goal on 18 February 2017, netting his team's second in a 3–2 home win against River Melilla CF in the Tercera División. He made his first-team debut on 11 September 2018, starting in a 2–1 away defeat of Málaga CF in the season's Copa del Rey.

On 6 March 2019, after becoming a regular starter, Martos renewed his contract until 2022 and was promoted to the main squad. The following 16 March, he further extended his link until 2024.

On 5 October 2020, Martos moved to fellow second division side Rayo Vallecano on a one-year loan deal. After helping Rayo in their promotion to La Liga, he returned to the Andalusians for the 2021–22 campaign, where he was mainly a backup option before suffering a knee injury in March 2022; his side also promoted to the top tier, but as champions.

Martos returned to trainings in October 2022, and was loaned to FC Cartagena in the second division on 19 January 2023, for the remainder of the season.

References

External links

1997 births
Living people
Footballers from Manresa
Spanish footballers
Association football defenders
Segunda División players
Segunda División B players
Tercera División players
UD Almería B players
UD Almería players
Rayo Vallecano players
FC Cartagena footballers